The village of Changa is situated to the west of the tehsil headquarters Petlad at about  away. It is about  North-west from the district headquarters Anand. The village is situated on Nadiad-Khambhat road and is  interior from Valetva. The village is connected by road with main centers such as Anand, Petlad, Nadiad, Ahmedabad etc. The village has very good transportation system and public electrical infrastructure.

This village has a beautiful pond besides a school, lush green bushes,  Huge trees, Schools, Library, Post Office, Health Center, Panchayat Ghar, Dharmshala, Grassland and “Charotar University of Science & Technology”.

Agriculture 
The village is known for its farming and milk production. It mainly farms wheat, non-basmati paddies, poha paddies, bajra, green millent and tobacco. Kalkatti plants are sowed.

Transport 
Dewa Railway Station, Dabhau Railway Station are the very nearby railway stations to Changa. Ahmedabad Jn Railway Station is major railway station 57 km near to Changa, Anand on Bombay Delhi line 22 km from Changa and Nadiad.

References

External links 
 Census of India

Villages in Anand district